

Brian C. Anderson is an American writer and editor of City Journal, a quarterly magazine, published by the Manhattan Institute for Policy Research.

Anderson received his BA and MA from Boston College. He obtained a doctorate in political philosophy from the University of Ottawa.

Anderson served as previously literary editor of Crisis during most of the 1990s.

In the late 1990s, he became a senior editor at the City Journal, a quarterly magazine, published by the Manhattan Institute for Policy Research.  In 2007, he became editor-in-chief there.

Works
Books
 A Manifesto for Media Freedom (2008)
 Democratic Capitalism and Its Discontents (2007)
 South Park Conservatives: The Revolt Against Liberal Media Bias (2005)
 The Pope in America (1996)
 Raymond Aron: The Recovery of the Political (1998)

Editor
 On Cultivating Liberty (Rowman & Littlefield 1999), a collection of Michael Novak's social and political writings

References

External links
 City Journal (bio)
 

Writers from New York City
Living people
Year of birth missing (living people)
Boston College alumni
University of Ottawa alumni
Manhattan Institute for Policy Research